Mandali is a town in Balad Ruz District, Diyala Governorate in Iraq, near the Iranian border. The town experienced Arabization during the Saddam era and has a mixed Kurdish and Arab population. The town is disputed between the federal government of Iraq and the autonomous Kurdistan Region.

Mandali is known for its palm tree orchards and dates.

History
The former name of Mandali was Bendink which was the capital of the Kurdish principality Bani Ammz. Kurds constituted 50% of the population in 1947 and the majority continued throughout the 1950s. About 4,000 Kurdish families were deported or fled the town after the collapse of the Kurdish movement in 1975.

During September 1980 of the Iran–Iraq War, the town and other nearby villages were attacked by Iranian forces. The population of the town was 25,656 in 1977 but decreased to 8,092 in 1987. A republican decree established Baladruz District in 1987 which Mandali was attached to.

Border trade
Being located in the vicinity of the Soumar border marketplace, in the Iranian Kermanshah province, there are commercial exchanges with Iran.

See also
Sumar

References

Populated places in Diyala Province
Iran–Iraq border crossings
Kurdish settlements in Iraq